Ulf Sandström may refer to:
 Ulf Sandström (professor) (born 1953), Swedish professor in social science
 Ulf Sandström (pianist) (born 1964), Swedish pianist
 Ulf Sandström (ice hockey) (born 1967), Swedish ice hockey player